Khatkar Khurd is a village in Shaheed Bhagat Singh Nagar district of Punjab State, India. The village is administrated by Sarpanch an elected representative of the village.

Demography 
As of 2011, Khatkar Khurd has a total number of 277 houses and population of 1310 of which 640 include are males while 670 are females according to the report published by Census India in 2011. The literacy rate of Khatkar Khurd is 78.41% higher than the state average of 75.84%. The population of children under the age of 6 years is 143 which is 10.92% of total population of Khatkar Khurd, and child sex ratio is approximately 959 as compared to Punjab state average of 846.

Most of the people are from Schedule Caste which constitutes 68.78% of total population in Khatkar Khurd. The town does not have any Schedule Tribe population so far.

As per the report published by Census India in 2011, 385 people were engaged in work activities out of the total population of Khatkar Khurd which includes 354 males and 31 females. According to census survey report 2011, 94.03% workers describe their work as main work and 5.97% workers are involved in Marginal activity providing livelihood for less than 6 months.

Education 
The village has a Punjabi medium, co-ed primary school established in 1955. The school provide mid-day meal as per Indian Midday Meal Scheme. As per Right of Children to Free and Compulsory Education Act the school provide free education to children between the ages of 6 and 14. The village also has an privet un-aided English medium, co-ed primary with upper primary and secondary school established in 2004.

Amardeep Singh Shergill Memorial college Mukandpur and Sikh National College Banga are the nearest colleges.

Transport 

See also 
List of villages in India

References

External links 
 Tourism of Punjab
 Census of Punjab
 Locality Based PINCode

Villages in Shaheed Bhagat Singh Nagar district